Fumani N Shilubana (born 22 March 1980), is a South African actor, director and producer. He is best known for his roles in the popular films  Zama Zama, My Father's War and Kalushi: The Story of Solomon Mahlangu. His the founder of FatherFigureZA, a Foundation that seeks to integrate man back into the family unit and former Chairman of Midrand Heat Basketball Club. In 2022 May 6 with Yerhu Film Commission they launched Yerhu News a Xitsonga News bulletin that plays on YouTube  every Friday at 19:00.

Early life
He was born on 22 March 1980 in small village Shiluvana, Tzaneen, Limpopo, South Africa. His father Clifford Shilubana was a school head master at Mlungisi Primary School and mother Nsatimuni Mundhlovu who is a Mozambican/South African was a nurse at Shiluvana Hospital. He has two younger sisters: Labani Mgimeti and Kumani Shilubana and an older brother Tebogo Maake.

Personal life

Fumani is the proud and a blessed father of three children, one boy and two girls Vulani Pontia, Nganakati-Nsuku and Fumani Nkateko Shilubana. 
Shilubana matriculated in 1998 at Mathews Phosa College in Mpumalanga, he enrolled at the University of Venda in 1999 to study Bachelor of Science (BSc) in Agriculture which he didn't complete and in 2000 he enrolled for Industrial Engineering at Tshwane University of Technology which he also dropped out when he wanted to pursue modelling in Italy, he also didn't go after enrolling for Speech and Drama Program at the South African State Theatre under the mentorship of the Play writer and Director Mpumelelo Paul Grootboom.

He started playing Basketball at age 15, he learnt about the game after his mother bought him a Basketball rule book, at 19 years he attended Basketball Trials at the University of Limpopo and was selected to represent Limpopo Province for the men senior team for the SASSU games at the annual tournament in Cape Town.

Career
He is well-known for his role as the producer and actor in the telenovela Giyani: Land of Blood. In the series, he played the role 'Vukosi Moyo'. After the conclusion of the series, he made the appearance in the series Mafanato which he Produced and Directed.

He has also acted in the popular television series: Soul City, Generations and Isidingo. He generally speaks in Xitsonga on television, which is his mother tongue. He played the popular role 'Detective Dabula' on the SABC3 soapie Isidingo.

Shilubana made his directorial debut with Khomelela, a film he created and co-wrote also produced. This project was part of his mission to get Xitsonga films on the main stream. He raised R40 000 for the film and shot 95% of the film at Hlovani River Lodge and the rest at Nkowankowa Township. The film was screened at Nkowankowa Community Hall.

Shitshembiso Mabasa, Fumani N. Shilubana, together with Teleti Khosa own Xiculu Multimedia a 100% black owned media company that was established in December 2019. The primary function of Xiculu is the production and distribution of Xitsonga content and has produced Mafanato series on Showmax, BeingTsongaInSA doccie series podcast about the shared experience of Vatsonga in the Republic of South Africa, Minkoka Mimbirhi series, A day with a Tsonga Legend talk show, Nyambondzwani short film, Sivara series and COVID-19 Xitsonga dashboard in collaboration with Xitsonga.org all in 2020. He is currently working on a few projects, some are in post like Timbita Ta Levuxeni:JUSTICIA and notable work that is still in development which he created and wrote is Brickfiledz: 12 Extensions based on a fictional world where politics, racism and classism rules. He is developing it with Tuks Tad Lungu and Mawingu.

Awards and nominations
Shilubana was nominated in 2005 for the Naledi Theatre Awards for Best Supporting Role on Relativity "Township Stories". The glittering star-studded ceremony took place at the University of Johannesburg Arts Centre on Sunday 19 February 2006.

He was nominated for his first screen acting award for Best Actor for Love Specialist at the F.A.M.E Awards 2016.

Stage

Filmography

Film Work

References

External links
 

Living people
South African male television actors
1980 births
South African male film actors
People from Tzaneen